Perils from the Sea is a collaborative studio album by American singer-songwriter Mark Kozelek and multi-instrumentalist Jimmy LaValle, released on April 30, 2013 on Caldo Verde Records.

Background and recording
On September 11, 2011, Sun Kil Moon's Mark Kozelek asked Jimmy LaValle, of The Album Leaf, to collaborate on a song, resulting in the album's opening track, "What Happened to My Brother". The two continued to work together over the next year, culminating in a finished album, Perils from the Sea.

"You Missed My Heart" previously appeared on Kozelek's 2013 live album Live at Phoenix Public House Melbourne.

Release
Perils from the Sea was originally set to be released under Kozelek and LaValle's monikers, Sun Kil Moon and The Album Leaf.

"You Missed My Heart" was later covered by Phoebe Bridgers on her 2017 album Stranger in the Alps and a German version was released by Tristan Brusch as a single from his 2023 album Am Wahn.

Track listing

Personnel

Musicians
Mark Kozelek – vocals
Jimmy LaValle – music
Marcel Gemperli – strings (11)
Peter Broderick – strings (11)
Vanessa Ruotolo – strings (11)

Recording personnel
Mark Kozelek – producer
Jimmy LaValle – producer, music recording 
 Aaron Prellwitz – vocals recording, mixing
 Gabe Shepard – vocals recording
 Nathan Winter – vocals recording

Artwork
 Mark Kozelek – photography
 Et Cetera – design

References

2013 albums
The Album Leaf albums
Caldo Verde Records albums
Mark Kozelek albums
Albums produced by Mark Kozelek